Masuiyama Daishirō (born 16 November 1948 as Noboru Sawada) is a former sumo wrestler and coach from Hyōgo, Japan. In 1980 he became the oldest wrestler to be promoted to the rank of ōzeki in the modern era (since 1958). After retiring from active competition in 1981 he became a sumo coach and an elder of the Japan Sumo Association under the name Mihogaseki and produced several top division wrestlers as head of Mihogaseki stable before stepping down upon reaching age 65 in 2013. He is also an enka musician.

Career
Born in Himeji, he was the son of former ōzeki Masuiyama Daishirō I,and the grandson of a komusubi in Osaka sumo, Tamanomori.  He was a talented swimmer at school but wanted to follow his father into sumo. Initially turned down because of his size, he eventually persuaded his father to let him join his Mihogaseki stable in January 1967. He began at the same time as Kitanoumi, a future yokozuna. He began fighting under the name Suiryū (his own surname was being used by another wrestler), adopting the Masuiyama shikona the following year. He reached sekitori status in July 1969 upon promotion to the jūryō division and reached the top makuuchi division for the first time in March 1970. Weighing barely 100 kg, and prone to injury, he was not able to establish himself in the division until 1972, temporarily dropping back to jūryō where he won his only yūshō or tournament championship in January of that year. In November 1972 he won the first of his five Ginō-shō or Technique prizes and earned promotion to komusubi. He was demoted after only one tournament and mostly remained in the maegashira ranks for the next few years. In May 1974 he scored 12 wins and was a tournament runner-up behind stablemate Kitanoumi.

In July 1978 he finally earned promotion to the third highest sekiwake rank, but once again was unable to maintain it, dropping back to maegashira level. At the end of 1979 he returned to sekiwake and scored 11 wins. In January 1980 he was again a tournament runner-up, this time to yokozuna Mienoumi, and after the tournament he was promoted to ōzeki. It had taken him 60 tournaments to get there from his top division debut, a record, and at thirty one years two months he was also the oldest to reach the rank since the introduction of the six tournaments a year system in 1958 (The latter record was broken by Kotomitsuki in July 2007). Masuiyama and Mihogaseki Oyakata became the first father and son ōzeki in sumo history. His ōzeki career was brief, and he announced his retirement during the March 1981 tournament.

Retirement from sumo
Masuiyama remained in the sumo world as an elder initially under the name Onogawa, and in November 1984 he succeeded his father as head coach of Mihogaseki stable, when the latter reached the retirement age of 65. His father died in 1986. He inherited ōzeki Hokuten'yū, and produced four other top division wrestlers: Higonoumi, Hamanoshima, Baruto and Aran.  Known as Mihogaseki Oyakata, he ran the stable until October 2013, when he dissolved the stable and moved his wrestlers to Kasugano stable. He was also formerly on the board of directors of the Japan Sumo Association. He reached the Sumo Association's mandatory retirement age of 65 in November 2013.

Fighting style
He began as a tsuppari specialist and would attack his opponents with a series of rapid thrusts to the chest. Following a left wrist injury he changed his style and would use his right hand to grab his opponent's mawashi and draw him in. He would use his great reflexes and flexible lower back to win with techniques such as uwatenage (overarm throw), uchimuso (inner thigh twist down), katasukashi (shoulder swing down) and other leg and yotsu-sumo moves. However he lacked the power to consistently beat the top ranked wrestlers.

Enka musician
Masuiyama is also an enka musician. His debut release was "Iroha koiuta" (いろは恋唄)in 1974. His musical career was in parallel with sumo wrestling, with his performances in clubs reportedly earning him 1.5 million yen a night, until the Sumo Association banned such extra-curricular activities. His notable songs include "Sonna Yuko ni  horemashita" (そんな夕子にほれました)(1974), "Sonna onna no hitorigoto" (そんな女のひとりごと)(1977) which sold 1.3 million copies, "Otoko no Senaka" (男の背中), "Hisoyakani  Hanayakani" (秘そやかに華やかに) (a duet with Naomi Matsui)(2012),"Yuko no Omise" (夕子のお店) (2013), "Fuyuko no blues" (冬子のブルース) (2013) and "A man's cup-sake" (男のコップ酒). In 2013, he retired from the Sumo Association and re-started exclusively as an enka musician. In 2015 he opened a chanko restaurant, Chanko Masuiyama, on the premises of the now-closed Mihogaseki stable.

Career record

See also
Glossary of sumo terms
List of sumo tournament top division runners-up
List of sumo tournament second division champions
List of past sumo wrestlers
List of ōzeki

References

1948 births
Living people
Japanese sumo wrestlers
People from Himeji, Hyōgo
Sumo people from Hyōgo Prefecture
Ōzeki
Hyōgo Prefecture
Enka singers